Andries Jonker (22 September 1962) is the Netherlands women's national football team manager and former player.

Jonker was at the helm of Dutch outfits Willem II, MVV and Volendam and was the assistant manager of VfL Wolfsburg, FC Barcelona and Bayern Munich as well. From 2014 to February 2017, he took up the role as head of the Arsenal F.C. Academy after which he returned to Wolfsburg to become the first-team manager.

Playing career
Jonker as a player featured in Holland for clubs, Volendam, De Volewijckers, De Meer and ZFC.

Managerial career

Jong Oranje
Jonker began his career managing at side DRC Amsterdam II in 1988. Two years afterward, he attained the post at the helm of the Netherlands's youth teams. He eventually held on to this role for seven years altogether.

FC Volendam
The head managerial post at Volendam was taken up by Jonker in July 1999. Jonker was in this role at the Kras Stadion until late June of the following year.

MVV Maastricht
In July 2004, Jonker was appointed as the manager of club MVV Maastricht. As such he saw the Sterrendragers get to the quarterfinals of the 2006 KNVB Cup.

Willem II
Jonker was named as an assistant manager at  Willem II for the 2006–07 season. The following season saw him fully take up the helm of the Tricolores. Jonker stayed on as manager of the club for another season only to leave the side in February 2009.

Bayern Munich
Jonker then joined Bayern Munich as an assistant to Louis van Gaal in July 2009. Wherein this role, Jonker won with Bayern the double of the Bundesliga and the DFB-Pokal of 2010. 
He then took over the side in April 2011 on an interim basis until the end of that season. Jonker, in June 2011, was announced as the new manager of Bayern Munich II. Jonker eventually left the club altogether in June 2012.

VfL Wolfsburg
Jonker joined up with VfL Wolfsburg soon afterward, thus staying in the Bundesliga. As so at the Volkswagen Arena he took up the position of an assistant manager, where he helped see the Wolves get to the DFB-Pokal semi finals of 2013.

Arsenal

Jonker was announced as the new academy manager at English club Arsenal ahead of the 2014–15 season.
Whilst at the club Jonkers formed an influential and key part in the academy's Hale End based facility being redesigned and rebuilt.

Return to Wolfsburg
Jonker again linked up with Wolfsburg so as to be appointed as the club's new first-team manager in February 2017. Jonker and Wolfsburg parted ways on 18 September 2017.

Telstar
Exactly seven years after his first appointment as assistant coach at VfL Wolfsburg, Jonker signed a two-year contract with Eerste Divisie club SC Telstar. At the club from Velsen-Zuid, Jonker was appointed as head coach and technical director, succeeding Mike Snoei and Piet Buter who left for De Graafschap.

In June 2022, Jonker parted ways with Telstar.

Netherlands Women 
On 24 August 2022, Jonker was appointed as the new Netherlands women's national team boss replacing Mark Parsons who was sacked after the team's poor performance at Euro 2022. Jonker was appointed until 2025.

Managerial statistics

References

1962 births
Living people
Footballers from Amsterdam
Dutch footballers
Association footballers not categorized by position
AVV De Volewijckers players
FC Volendam players
Dutch football managers
FC Volendam managers
Netherlands women's national football team managers
FC Barcelona non-playing staff
MVV Maastricht managers
Willem II (football club) non-playing staff
Willem II (football club) managers
FC Bayern Munich non-playing staff
FC Bayern Munich managers
FC Bayern Munich II managers
VfL Wolfsburg managers
SC Telstar managers
Eredivisie managers
Eerste Divisie managers
Bundesliga managers
Regionalliga managers
Dutch expatriate football managers
Dutch expatriate sportspeople in Spain
Dutch expatriate sportspeople in Germany
Expatriate football managers in Germany
Arsenal F.C. non-playing staff